Tunc Ucyildiz (born April 22, 1978, in Ankara, Turkey) is a Turkish surfer who has won Turkey's first national surfing title in October 2012. He is known for his efforts to jump start surfing activities and competitive surfing in Turkey. With the help of his friends and associates he has managed I.S.A (International Surfing Association) to officially declare Turkey as its 72. member nation.

In May 2013, Tunc Ucyildiz along with Onat Ersoy, became the first Turkish surfers to represent Turkey in I.S.A World Surfing Games where national teams compete.

References

1978 births
Sportspeople from Ankara
Turkish surfers
Living people